Macroglossum caldum is a moth of the  family Sphingidae. It is known from Papua New Guinea and the Philippines.

Subspecies
Macroglossum caldum caldum
Macroglossum caldum philippinense Clark, 1928 (Philippines)

References

Macroglossum
Moths described in 1926